Geneva is an unincorporated community in Fairfield County, in the U.S. state of Ohio.

History
The community was named after Geneva, in Switzerland, the ancestral land of a large share of the early settlers. A variant name was Flagdale. A post office called Flagdale was established in 1887, and remained in operation until 1903.

References

Unincorporated communities in Fairfield County, Ohio
Unincorporated communities in Ohio